Pete Sampras defeated Petr Korda in the final, 4–6, 6–3, 3–6, 6–3, 6–2 to win the men's singles tennis title at the 1994 Indian Wells Masters.

Jim Courier was the defending champion, but lost to Patrick Rafter in the second round.

Seeds
The top eight seeds receive a bye into the second round.

Draw

Finals

Section 1

Section 2

Section 3

Section 4

External links
 ATP Singles draw

Singles
1994 Newsweek Champions Cup and the Evert Cup